Microcalicha is a genus of moths in the family Geometridae first described by Sato in 1981.

Species
Microcalicha fumosaria (Leech, 1891) Japan, China, Taiwan
Microcalicha melanosticta (Hampson) China
Microcalicha sordida (Butler, 1878) Japan, Korea
Microcalicha minima (Warren, 1896) north-eastern Himalayas, Borneo, Sumatra
Microcalicha delika (Swinhoe, 1902) Borneo, Sumatra, southern Thailand
Microcalicha insolitaria (Leech) China
Microcalicha chloralphus (Wehrli) China
Microcalicha punctimarginaria (Leech, 1897) China, Borneo, Sumatra, Peninsular Malaysia

References

Boarmiini